Mount Akhun (Ахун) is a stand-alone mountain in the Khostinsky City District of Sochi, Russia. Wedged between the Matsesta and Khosta rivers, this karst massif is the highest point of the Sochi littoral.

Its summit is marked by a 100-foot-tall Romanesque tower. It was built in 1936 from limestone ashlar. The tower offers panoramic views of the Western Caucasus as far south as Gagra and Pitsunda. An 11-km-long serpentine road leads to the tower from the Sputnik Hotel.

Nearby are the ruins of a medieval Christian church. The entire massif contains about 20 caves. The forests support 200 species of higher plants. The scenic Eagles' Rocks stretch along the right bank of the Agura River toward the Agura Falls.

The mount was apparently sacred for the local Ubykh community. Its name translates from the Ubykh dialect as "the mountain giant".

References 

Sochi
Mountains of Krasnodar Krai
Natural monuments of Russia